Etiopiasafari is a 1976 single by Jaakko Löytty, Kaisu Löytty and Jukka Linkoheimo. It was released in support of their tour of Ethiopia the same year. It was released by Kirkon nuorisotyön keskus and Nuorten keskus, organisations of the Evangelical Lutheran Church of Finland.

During the trip to Ethiopia, the Löyttys and Linkoheimo met in an Addis Abeba nightclub an Oromo musician by the name of Ali Mohammed Birra, and bought from him his LP record. On that LP there is a song about the River Hawash, which later inspired Jaakko Löytty to write a song of the same name that became the title song of his 1984 LP Hawash!

Songs

A. Etiopiaan – Safarilaulu ['To Ethiopia – A Safari Song']
Jukka Linkoheimo – vocals, 12 string guitar
Kari Chydenius – electric guitar
Kare Ojaniemi – bass
Petri Ojaniemi – organ
Heikki Chydenius – guitar
Arto Rauta – tambourine
Kaisla Ojaniemi – maracas
 Jaakko Löytty – guitar
 Kaisu Löytty – triangle
Music: J. Linkoheimo, words: K. & J. Löytty
 Arrangement, conductor, producer: Kare Ojaniemi
 Recording engineer: Timo Ulkuniemi, 4 April 1976, Helsinki (recorded live)

B. Jumala on sama siellä ja täällä [‘God is the same here and there’]
Jaakko löytty – vocals, guitar, harmonica
Kaisu Löytty – vocals
 Sakari Löytty – drums
 Jouko Laivuori— electric piano
 Seppo Lindell – bass
 Jukka Linkoheimo – vocals, guitar
Music: J. Löytty, words: K. & J. Löytty
Recording engineer — Seppo Lindell, Tampere, 18 February 1976

External links
Etiopiasafari in Discogs

1976 singles
1976 songs